Rockford is an unincorporated community in Tuscarawas County, in the U.S. state of Ohio.

History
Rockford was laid out and platted in 1816.

References

Unincorporated communities in Tuscarawas County, Ohio
Unincorporated communities in Ohio